William B. Finneran (February 14, 1936 – November 30, 2014) was an American politician who served in the New York State Assembly from the 89th district from 1977 to 1982.

He died of lung cancer on November 30, 2014, in Clifton Park, New York at age 78.

References

1936 births
2014 deaths
Democratic Party members of the New York State Assembly